Făgăraș Citadel is a historic monument in Făgăraș, Brașov County, Romania.

The construction of the fortress started in 1310, on the site of a wooden  fortification with earth ramparts from the 12th century. Archeological research shows that the old fortification was violently destroyed around the middle of the 13th century, presumably in connection with the Mongol invasion of 1241. Located halfway between Brașov and Sibiu and close to Wallachia, the Făgăraș Citadel provided a defensive position against possible incursions into south-eastern Transylvania. 

In 1526,  consolidated the citadel, doubling the thickness of the walls. In 1541, the Ottomans attacked the fortress and captured Mailat, who died in captivity at Yedikule Fortress in Istanbul. Gáspár Bekes, owner of the citadel between 1567 and 1573, constructed the moat around the fortress, the excavated earth being used to strengthen the inner part of the walls.  During the time of Stephen VIII Báthory (voivode of Transylvania from 1571 to 1586) and Balthasar Báthory (lord of the fortress from 1588 to 1594), the first bastion was constructed in the south-eastern corner of the outer defensive ring. In 1599, Michael the Brave occupied Făgăraș Citadel and sheltered there his family and the royal treasure. In the 17th century, Prince Gabriel Bethlen gave it priority over Alba Iulia in modernizing the fortifications, while Michael I Apafi transformed it, due to its strengthened position, into a princely residence.

In all, some 5,000 people were detained at this location, many of whom were subjected to torture. Cold, hunger and lack of any form of medical care were the causes of a large number of deaths among detainees. According to researchers, either 161 or 166 inmates were officially declared to have died in this prison, though ex-detainees put the number much higher. 

Between 1965 and 1977 restoration work was carried out. Currently, the citadel functions as a museum, housing various artifacts.

See also
 Tourism in Romania
 Seven Wonders of Romania

Notes 

Buildings and structures in Brașov County
Castles in Romania
Tourist attractions in Brașov County
Historic monuments in Brașov County
1310 establishments in Romania
Defunct prisons in Romania
Făgăraș